Frenchville is a hamlet located in the Town of Western in Oneida County, New York. Wells Creek converges with the Mohawk River in Frenchville.

References

Hamlets in Oneida County, New York
Hamlets in New York (state)